The 2011–12 season was Galatasarays 108th in existence and the club's 54th consecutive season in the Süper Lig. This article shows statistics of the club's players in the season, and also lists all matches that the club played in during the season.

Season overview
Ünal Aysal was elected as the new president of Galatasaray in May 2011. After his election, he made an agreement with coach Fatih Terim for the 2011–12 season. The club signed Swedish international striker Johan Elmander for three seasons from Bolton Wanderers on a free transfer.

Club

Coaching staff

Board of Directors

Medical staff

Other personnel

Grounds

Kit
Uniform Manufacturer: Nike

Chest Advertising's: Türk Telekom

Back Advertising's: Ülker

Arm Advertising's: Avea

Short Advertising's: Nikon

Sponsorship
Companies that Galatasaray S.K. currently has sponsorship deals with include.

Players

Squad information

Transfers

In

Total spending:  €23.80 million

* - 1 player will leave the club at the end of the 2011-2012 season.

Out

Total income:  €14.1M

Expenditure:  €9.70M

* - if Atletico Madrid finishes La Liga as a UEFA Champions League participant: €1M bonus fee. If they finishes La Liga as a UEFA Europa League participant: €0.5M bonus fee.

Friendly matches

Pre-season
Galatasaray start the 2011-12 season with a training session to be held in Florya on Monday June 27, 2011. On July 2, Galatasaray will be leaving for Austria in order to camp near the town of Wörgl until July 12.

The second summer camp of Galatasaray is planned to be in Germany.

Kickoff times are in CET.

Other friendlies

Competitions

Overview

Süper Lig

Standings

Results summary

Results by round

Matches

Championship play-offs

Playoff table

Results summary

Results by round

Matches

Turkish Cup

Statistics

Squad statistics

Goals
Includes all competitive matches.

Last updated on 12 May 2012

Clean sheets

Disciplinary record

Overall

Attendance

 Sold season tickets: 27,900

See also
2011–12 Süper Lig
2011–12 Turkish Cup

References

External links
Galatasaray Sports Club Official Website 
Turkish Football Federation - Galatasaray A.Ş. 
uefa.com - Galatasaray AŞ

2011-12
Turkish football clubs 2011–12 season
2011-12
2011 in Istanbul
2012 in Istanbul
Galatasaray Sports Club 2011–12 season